NGC 279 is a lenticular galaxy in the constellation Cetus. It was discovered on October 1, 1785 by William Herschel.

References

External links
 

0279
00532
+00-03-019a
03055
17851001
Cetus (constellation)
Lenticular galaxies
Discoveries by William Herschel